Ashok Pandit is an Indian sport shooter. He won the first gold in shooting in the Commonwealth Games for India. He was awarded the Arjuna Award in 1985.

References

Living people
Year of birth missing (living people)
Indian male sport shooters
Shooters at the 1982 Commonwealth Games
Shooters at the 1990 Commonwealth Games
Shooters at the 1994 Commonwealth Games
Shooters at the 1998 Commonwealth Games
Commonwealth Games medallists in shooting
Commonwealth Games gold medallists for India
Commonwealth Games silver medallists for India
Commonwealth Games bronze medallists for India
Asian Games medalists in shooting
Shooters at the 1994 Asian Games
Shooters at the 1998 Asian Games
Asian Games bronze medalists for India
Medalists at the 1994 Asian Games
Medalists at the 1998 Asian Games
Recipients of the Arjuna Award
ISSF rifle shooters
20th-century Indian people
Medallists at the 1982 Commonwealth Games
Medallists at the 1990 Commonwealth Games
Medallists at the 1994 Commonwealth Games
Medallists at the 1998 Commonwealth Games